The Wright T-3 Tornado, also given the USAF designation Wright V-1950 was an American liquid-cooled aircraft piston engine, designed in the early 1920s.

Development
The T-3 was the third in the line of 'T' (Tornado) series engines developed by Wright Aeronautical on the lines of the Wright-Hisso engines produced during the First World War using monobloc cylinder blocks and gear driven overhead camshafts. The T-3 and T-3A appeared from 1923 producing  with the final development, the T-4, producing  by December of that year.

Applications
 Curtiss CS
 Naval Aircraft Factory PN-7 (T-2)
 Martin SC
 Martin T2M
 Martin T3M
 Wright F2W
 Dayton-Wright XO-3

Specifications (T-3)

See also

References

Notes

Bibliography

 Gunston, Bill. World Encyclopaedia of Aero Engines. Cambridge, England. Patrick Stephens Limited, 1989. 

T-3
1920s aircraft piston engines